Earle Weston Kirton (born 29 December 1940) was an All Blacks rugby union player from New Zealand.  He was a first five-eighth.

He played 48 matches for the All Blacks, scoring 42 points. He was in 13 tests where he scored 12 test points (4 tries). He toured the British Isles and France 1963-64 and 1967, and played against Australia and France in 1968, Wales in 1969 and South Africa in 1970.

He was born in Taumarunui and educated at St Joseph's Convent School, Upper Hutt and St Patrick's College, Silverstream. He studied at the University of Otago and played for Otago.

In 1971 he took a postgraduate dentistry course in England and played for the Harlequins, Middlesex and the Barbarians (and was also a selector-coach).

On returning to New Zealand he coaching Wellington (1986–87) and then was a national selector and also assistant coach to Laurie Mains.

References

Bibliography
Palenski, R., Chester, R., and McMillan, N., (2005). The Encyclopaedia of New Zealand Rugby (4th ed.).  Auckland: Hodder Moa Beckett. 

1940 births
Living people
New Zealand rugby union players
New Zealand international rugby union players
Rugby union fly-halves
Otago rugby union players
People educated at St. Patrick's College, Silverstream
People from Upper Hutt
Rugby union players from Manawatū-Whanganui